Giulio Regondi (1822 – 6 May 1872) was a Swiss-born classical guitarist, concertinist and composer active in France and (mainly) the United Kingdom.

Regondi was born of a German mother and an Italian father in Geneva, Switzerland. In 1831 Fernando Sor dedicated his Souvenir d'amitié op. 46 to Regondi, a child prodigy, when the boy was just nine.

There is a reference to his appearing in London in 1831, presented as a child prodigy of the guitar. Most of Regondi's concertina music was written for the English system, however, at which he was a virtuoso, though his guitar music is probably better known. His works for solo guitar comprise a set of etudes, variations on a theme by Bellini and five larger works.

Regondi died in London.

Selected works
Nocturne 'Rêverie''' op. 19, for guitarFête villageoise 'Rondo caprice' op. 20, for guitarAir varié No. 1 op. 21, for guitarAir varié No. 2 op. 22, for guitarIntroduction and caprice op. 23, for guitarTen Études, for guitarFeuillet d'album for guitarFantasie über Mozarts Don Giovanni"(Solo on Don Giovanni, partly from Thalberg's piece) for guitar (1840) rediscovered in 2007
Air varié de l’opera de Bellini I Capuleti e i Montecchi" for guitar (1845) rediscovered in  2007Fantasia on English Airs, for concertina and pianoLeisure Moments (1-6), for concertina and piano (1857)Morceau de salon, for concertina and pianoRecollections of Home, for concertinaEcce ridente il cielo'', for concertina

External links
 Articles on Regondi by Alessandro Boris Amisich
Giulio Regondi in Ireland by Thomas Lawrence (ref)

Publications
Concert Works for Guitar opp.19-23 edited by Simon Wynberg (Chanterelle Verlag)
Air varié de l’opera de Bellini: I Capuleti e i Montecchi edited by Stefan R. Hackl  (Editions Orphée)
Giulio Regondi: Ten Etudes revised and edited by Matanaya Ophee (Editions Orphée)

Sheet music
Rischel & Birket-Smith's Collection of guitar music 1 Det Kongelige Bibliotek, Denmark
Boije Collection The Music Library of Sweden
George C. Krick Collection of Guitar Music Washington University
 

Images
Images of Giulio Regondi (Royal Academy of Music)
Giulio Regondi, "The Young Guitar player as he appeared on the 3rd of Sepr. at the Royal Adelphi Theatre." 
Image
Image (Article: A 41-cent emendation)

References

1822 births
1872 deaths
19th-century guitarists
19th-century male musicians
19th-century classical composers
Composers for concertina
Composers for the classical guitar
Concertina players
Romantic composers
Swiss classical composers
Swiss classical guitarists
Swiss male classical composers